Glen Massey is a former mining village,  west of Ngāruawāhia, which was, until 1958, terminus of the Glen Massey Line. It then went into decline, but is now becoming a home for Hamilton commuters.

Name 
There is no official name. Various names appeared on maps and in reports of the area.

Mangahoa is the only name in the area shown on an 1859 map, probably applying to what was later called the Mangaohe Stream, called Mangaohei in an 1867 report, and used on maps up to 1966, but officially named Firewood Creek in 1976. As early as 1909 a report referred to Firewood Creek.

Kupa Kupa was the name used at the 1860s compensation hearings for the  area north of Te Awa o te Atua (River of God - now Firewood Creek), and stretching to what is now Huntly, as it included the former village of that name near Huntly.

Te Akatea (translates to white rata, which was plentiful) village settlement of 22 settlers was formed in 1887, spread along much of the route between Ngāruawāhia and Waingaro.

Glen Massey seems to have first appeared in 1914. One source asserts there was a large Scottish population in the area, the name ‘Glen’ means ‘valley’, and the name  ‘Massey’ honoured the Prime Minister, William Massey, elected in 1912.

Geology 

The geology of Glen Massey accounts for its rise and fall as a former coal mining centre.

The 1925 map below shows a simple layout. Since then, maps of 1966 and 2005 have differentiated more strata, as in this list, starting with the oldest rocks -

Triassic (L on the map - 250-200mya), in the Newcastle Formation. They are -
 Hakarimata Formation of indurated siltstones and tuffaceous sandstones, with other siltstones and conglomerates,
 Marakopa Formation, containing intraformational slump structures and shell-beds.
Jurassic (T - 200-145mya)
 Te Pake Sandstone, with plant fragments,
 Pongawhakatiki Siltstone of Ururoan age, another indurated rock.
Eocene (CM - 33-27mya) Waikato coal measures (see next section).

Oligocene (K - late Whaingaroan - 30mya) Glen Massey Formation, named after this locality -
 Elgood Limestone (with up to 95% CaCO3), hard flaggy, grey calcareous
 Dunphail Siltstone (outcropping in Dunphail Bluffs, with up to 60% CaCO3)
 Ahirau Sandstone bluffs (with 40-60% CaCO3).
The Late Pliocene to Middle Quaternary (3.6-0.8mya) in the lowlands -
 Walton Subgroup of pumiceous fine-grained sand and silt with interbedded peat, pumiceous gravelly sand, diatomaceous mud, and non-welded ignimbrite and tephra.
The Late Pleistocene (0.13-0.012mya) also in the valleys -
 Hinuera formation of sand and gravel, interbedded with silt and some peat.

Coal mining 
Although the Kupakupa, Renown and Kemps Seams are all present, only Kupakupa has been worked to any extent. Kupakupa Seam reserves are estimated at less than 40 000 tonnes, although 2m tonnes may be concealed under the northern area, and over 1m in 'sub-economic' seams of the old Waipa Colliery.

The beds are in a graben and dip gently N or NW. Major faults strike N or NNW and minor faults NE.

Glen Massey's coal was known of by 1867, when it was suggested a tramway should be built down the Mangaohei valley. However, seams closer to river transport were available, so no significant exploitation began until 1907.

Between 1914 and 1977 about 3.5m tonnes of coal were dug in the Glen Massey coalfield, as follows -

A 1976 estimate said 30,000 tons might remain in the coalfield, but a 1984 report suggested it was too deep for economic opencasting.

Waipa Colliery 
In 1907 a request was made to transport coal by motor vehicle and, in 1908, the Ngaruawahia Dairy Association took 3 tons of coal a week from the seams that were to become Waipa Colliery, during a strike at Huntly mines. A start was made on a tramway in 1908, soon described as a light railway for the Co-operative Coal Co Ltd, set up by 3 farmers, soon renamed Ngaruawahia Coal Co Ltd. and merged into Waipa Railway and Collieries Ltd. An adit into an  seam had been started by 1911.

Clay 
The China Clay and Porcelain Co Ltd was formed in 1924 to export china clay and make bricks, tiles and bathroom-ware. It probably only made bricks in any quantity. It went into voluntary liquidation in April 1930.

History 

The archaeology map shows no sites between Ngāruawāhia and Waingaro, though many stone axe heads were found on nearby Te Akatea farm, which was largely bush until it was burnt after 1905. Therefore, it's likely the area was largely bush until the arrival of the first settlers, being used by the surrounding populations for food and clothing, including birds, bracken, karaka, hinau, nikau, kahikatea, raupo, kiekie; flax, dyes from muds, bark, or berries and oils from seeds such as titoki.

Te Akatea settlement 
After confiscation in 1863, the area was next mentioned in 1879 as not belonging to the Waste Lands Board. At Te Akatea, in 1887, a village settlement of 22 families was formed. An 1888 report said, "I determined when opportunity presented to see if the solution of the problem here was to be a success. These settlements extend from Firewood Creek to within 7 miles of the Hot Springs, and about the same distance from Ngāruawāhia. The land being of fair quality, consisting of both bush and open fern land.  They erected 12 timber houses, felled bush, sown grass, orchards, gardens, fenced, grew wheat. Around this settlement 20,000 acres of Government land are now being surveyed for settlement." Te Akatea post office opened in 1889. The first mention of Te Akatea in the annual sheep returns was in 1891.

Mining village 
At its peak Glen Massey had a general store, butcher, post office (replacing Te Akatea in 1914), hall, church and a fire station. The medical association had 120 members in 1919 and 90 in 1920.

A 1919 Board of Trade report described Glen Massey's poor housing, saying it, "is totally inadequate for the needs of the workers, and overcrowding exists. In one case, a miner, with his wife and five children, is living in a two-roomed cottage, and in another ease there are five persons (three children) living in two rooms. At least 10 roomy houses are required for immediate needs. The huts provided by the Waipa Company at present have no fire-places or water tanks, and both these necessary conveniences should be provided."

The village also had a sawmill, brickworks and a pottery. The butcher closed in 1962, the store in 1967 and the post office in 1984.

Roads 

By 1886 there was a route between Waingaro Landing on the Raglan Harbour and Ngāruawāhia via the Waingaro Hot Springs. In 1888 it was still only a bridle track and the settlers were asking for government employment on the roads. By 1929 it was said to be in "fair order" and metalled. Road improvement is being carried out. relief work on the road. inspected by minister. The road from Ngāruawāhia to Te Akau was sealed by 1976.

Buses 
In 1921 Bob Gibb of Ngāruawāhia took over the mail run to Waingaro and Te Akau and cream run to the Ngāruawāhia butter factory, with a solid tyred International. Daily buses ran from 1930 until between 1958 and 1961.

Education 
The first school in Waingaro was opened in 1892. Education was for 3 days, the other 3 days of the week was given by the same teacher at Te Akatea. Te Akatea School was renamed Glen Massey School in 1914, when the church was moved across the road for use as a school, a marquee was erected and the permanent school opened on 1 February 1915.

Glen Massey School is now a state full primary (years 1-8) school, with 5 classrooms, 6 teachers, a principal, a deputy principal, special needs teacher and 2 teacher aides. Pupil numbers rose from 58 in 1915 to a peak of 146 and 4 teachers in 1957, falling to 64 in 1960.

Utilities 
A private telephone line was being planned in 1914, though a public phone was provided that year and arrangements were being made for a line in 1902. The 1905 estimates had provided for a line from Ngāruawāhia to Waingaro, on which a loss was reported in 1907.

Electricity supply was investigated in 1925 and, in 1930, it was said a line to Wilton Collieries and the village, "would be undertaken as early as possible". Electric street lights came in 1936.

Demographics 
At its peak Glen Massey was home to about 400, but declined after the colliery closures. It is now growing slightly and becoming more prosperous, presumably as, like other parts of the Waikato Western Hills area (up from 1026 in 2006 to 1242 in 2013), it has more commuters to Hamilton. In 2013 19.6% of the Western Hills population was Māori.

Glen Massey was in meshblocks 0853300 (NW), 0853400 (NE), 0853500 (SW) and 0853600 (SE), which had these census figures -

In the 2018 census the area was in blocks which covered a larger area - 7011120 (99 people), 7011117 (150) and 7011124 (165) - total 414.

References

External links 
 1:50,000 map
 1925 geological map
 1860s map
 Google street scene at former railway crossing (a short path follows the old track)
Photos -
 1914 rope-hauled tramway incline
 incline, screening bins and recently felled/burnt bush
 1914 mine entrance and screening bins
 Waipa Colliery at closure in 1930 and coal train
 1940s aerial view of Wilton Collieries
 1941-1979 Retrolens aerial views

Waikato District
Populated places in Waikato
Coal mines in New Zealand
Mining communities in New Zealand